Elamville is an unincorporated community in the southwest corner of Barbour County, Alabama, United States. In the early to mid-20th century Elamville was known for the "Old Oak Tree" in the middle of town where the elderly men of the community played dominoes on the state- provided concrete picnic table.

History
Elamville was named after a local church, Elam Church, which itself was named for the ancient kingdom of Elam.

References

Unincorporated communities in Alabama
Unincorporated communities in Barbour County, Alabama